Rhyan Mansell (born 4 June 2000) is a professional Australian rules footballer who plays for the Richmond Football Club in the Australian Football League (AFL).

Early life, junior football and state-league football
Mansell spent his formative years in the southern Launceston suburb of Prospect, played junior football for the North Launceston Football Club and attended high school at Prospect's St Patrick's College.

As a junior, Mansell was a member of the Tasmanian State Academy and joined the  Next Generation Academy as a 16 year old in the program's inaugural 2016 intake. He trained with 's AFL squad regularly as part of the program.

In 2017 Mansell played state representative football with the Tassie Mariners . In the same year, he made his senior Tasmanian State League debut with North Launceston and was a member of the club's premiership winning side in their grand final win over Laurderdale that September.

Mansell suffered a significant quad injury in early 2018, hampering his output during the national academy series season with the Mariners. Mansell was eventually selected to represent Tasmania as a member of The Allies side at the 2018 AFL Under 18 Championships, but missed two games as a result of the earlier quad injury. He returned to TSL football later in the year, and featured in another grand final win with North Launceston. At the end of the season, Mansell was invited to attend the Tasmanian AFL draft combine.

As an overage player in 2019, Mansell joined the newly re-formed Tasmania Devils side in the Victorian-based NAB League Boys competition, where he placed fourth in the club's best and fairest. He played state-league football once again for North Launceston that season, winning a third-straight TSL premiership. Mansell was once again eligible to be drafted in 2019 (including with priority academy access by North Melbourne), but was again looked over at the national and rookie drafts.

Mansell relocated to Adelaide in 2020, playing senior SANFL football with Woodville-West Torrens. He became a key player across the course of the season and featured in a finals series that included a premiership. He contributed a strong 19 disposals, eight marks and five tackles while playing as a half-back in the club's grand final victory over North Adelaide.

Despite his strong season, Mansell was again overlooked by AFL clubs at the 2020 national and rookie drafts.

Junior statistics

NAB League Boys

|- style="background-color: #EAEAEA"
! scope="row" style="text-align:center" | 2019
|Tasmania Devils
| 27 || 13 || 8 || — || 139 || 49 || 191 || 51 || 51 || 0.6 || — || 10.7 || 3.8 || 14.7 || 3.9 || 3.9
|-
|- class="sortbottom"
! colspan=3| Career
! 13
! 8
! —
! 139
! 49
! 191
! 51
! 51
! 0.6
! —
! 10.7
! 3.8
! 14.7
! 3.9
! 3.9
|}
Under 18 National Championships

|- style="background-color: #EAEAEA"
! scope="row" style="text-align:center" | 2018
|Allies
| 6 || 2 || 1 || — || 9 || 4 || 13 || 2 || 8 || 0.5 || — || 4.5 || 2.0 || 6.5 || 1.0 || 4.0
|-
|- class="sortbottom"
! colspan=3| Career
! 2
! 1
! —
! 9
! 4
! 13
! 2
! 8
! 0.5
! —
! 4.5
! 2.0
! 6.5
! 1.0
! 4.0
|}

AFL career

2021 season
In the days following the 2020 draft, Mansell was offered a chance to train with  under a trial period basis. Mansell  impressed during his trial and in February 2021, was signed by the club under the AFL's pre-season supplemental selection rules.

Mansell began playing practice matches with Richmond reserves squad from late-February 2021 and into the opening weeks of the AFL season. Following an impressive match against the Collingwood reserves in early April, Mansell was selected to make his AFL debut in the club's round 4 match against  at the Adelaide Oval.

Player profile
Mansell plays as a shutdown small-defender and as a rebounding half-back.

Statistics
Updated to the end of round 23, 2022.

|-
| 2021
|  || 31 || 13 || 1 || 0 || 91 || 53 || 144 || 35 || 29 || 0.1 || 0.0 || 7.0 || 4.1 || 11.1 || 2.7 || 2.2
|- 
| 2022
|  || 31 || 2 || 0 || 0 || 19 || 6 || 25 || 12 || 2|| 0.0 || 0.0 || 9.5 || 3.0 || 12.5 || 6.0 || 1.0
|- class="sortbottom" 
! colspan=3| Career
! 15
! 1
! 0
! 110
! 59
! 169
! 47
! 31
! 0.1
! 0.0
! 7.3
! 3.9
! 11.3
! 3.1
! 2.1
|}

Honours and achievements
State-league
3x TSL premiership player: 2017, 2018, 2019
SANFL premiership player: 2020

Personal life
Mansell is a Palawa Indigenous Australian. His father Brett won a TSL premiership with North Launceston in 1995.

He is the cousin of  player Tarryn Thomas.

References

External links

Rhyan Mansell's profile at AFL Draft Central

Living people
2000 births
Richmond Football Club players
Indigenous Australian players of Australian rules football
North Launceston Football Club players
Woodville-West Torrens Football Club players
Australian rules footballers from Tasmania